This was the first edition of the event.

Martin and Melzer won the title, defeating Alejandro Moreno Figueroa and Miguel Ángel Reyes-Varela in the final, 6–2, 6–4.

Seeds

Draw

Draw

References
 Main Draw

Morelos Open- Doubles
2014 Doubles